Movement is the second studio album by American indie rock band Gossip, it was released on May 6, 2003.

Track listing
 "Nite" – 2:26
 "Jason's Basement" – 2:00
 "No, No, No" – 1:57
 "Don't (Make Waves)" – 2:34
 "All My Days" – 2:41
 "Yesterday's News" – 4:10
 "Fire/Sign" – 2:33
 "Confess" – 2:18
 "Lesson Learned" – 1:27
 "Dangerrr" – 2:16
 "Light Light Sleep" – 6:17

Personnel
 Beth Ditto – vocalist, piano
 Brace Paine – guitar, bass guitar
 Kathy Mendonca – drums

References

2003 albums
Gossip (band) albums
Kill Rock Stars albums